The Kona giant looper moth (Scotorythra megalophylla) is an extinct species of moth in the family Geometridae. The species was first described by Edward Meyrick in 1899. It was endemic to Hawaii.

This species had a wingspan of about three inches (8 cm), and was the second largest endemic moth in Hawaii, surpassed only by the still-extant Blackburn's sphinx (Manduca blackburni).

Sources

Endemic moths of Hawaii
Extinct Hawaiian animals
Extinct moths
Extinct insects since 1500
Taxonomy articles created by Polbot
Moths described in 1899